Tim Molenaar (born 19 February 1981 in Masterton, New Zealand) is a rugby union player for Moseley in the RFU Championship. He plays as a centre.

Molenaar signed for Gloucester Rugby from Nottingham in August 2009 after a deal to sign Seru Rabeni fell through.

On 28 October 2013, it was announced that Harlequins have signed Tim Molenaar to a short-term deal following his release from Gloucester Rugby Following his release from Harlequins, Molenaar signed for newly promoted side London Welsh for the 2014-15 season. On 8 June 2015, Molenaar returned to the RFU Championship to sign for Moseley from the 2015-16 season.

References

External links
London Welsh profile
Harlequins profile
Gloucester Rugby profile

Living people
1981 births
London Welsh RFC players
Rugby union players from Masterton
Wellington rugby union players
New Zealand expatriate rugby union players
Expatriate rugby union players in England
New Zealand expatriate sportspeople in England
Rugby union centres